Rive (plural: rives) is a French word meaning "bank" (of a river). It could also refer to the following people or places:

Geography

France
Rives is the name of 2 communes in France:
 Rives, Isère in the Isère département
 Rives, Lot-et-Garonne, in the Lot-et-Garonne département

United States
Rives Township, Michigan
Rives, Missouri
Rives, Tennessee

People
Rives is the name of several people:
Rives (poet) — a performance poet
Alexander Rives — U.S. District Court judge from Virginia
Alfred L. Rives — was an American engineer
Francis Everod Rives - American politician from Virginia
George Lockhart Rives - American diplomat
Jean Baptiste Rives — French secretary in early 19th-century Kingdom of Hawaii
Jean-Pierre Rives — a former French Rugby Union player
William Cabell Rives - American diplomat and politician from Virginia

Other
Rives (grape), French wine grape

See also
 Rives-Dervoises, Haute-Marne, France
 Rive (disambiguation)
 Rivière (disambiguation)
 Ríos (disambiguation)
 Rio (disambiguation)
 Rivers (disambiguation)
 River (disambiguation)